Emerald Pool is the name of several locations.

Yosemite
Emerald Pool is a small, shallow lake, with an area of less than one acre. It is located about 80 meters above Vernal Fall in Yosemite National Park. It is named for its deep green color, which is caused by algae living on the rocks at the bottom of the pool. In the summertime during diminished water flow, the Silver Apron (a smooth granite slope over which the Merced River flows into the Emerald Pool) is frequently (albeit illegally) used by hikers as a water slide. Swimming or wading in the Emerald Pool or entering the Silver Apron is prohibited by the National Park Service since waders or swimmers have been swept over Vernal Fall and killed, and people sliding down the Silver Apron risk collision with hidden rocks at its lower end. This prohibition is clearly marked with signs.

Yuba River

There also is an Emerald Pools destination in California along the Yuba River. The South Yuba River flows down a  waterfall into a sheer rock canyon with two pools. The crystal-clear water is deep,  near the middle of the pool, and many people jump off the cliffs for enjoyment. A second pool nearby is nearly as large. Despite the cool water temperature it is a popular swimming spot, particularly among young adults.

Yellowstone National Park
Emerald Pool, a hot spring named for its emerald green color, is one of the main attractions at Black Sand Basin in Yellowstone National Park. Its temperature is 154.6 °F and its dimensions are 27x38 feet with a depth of 25 feet. The color is due to growth of yellow bacteria and algae. Cooling, the result of objects thrown into the pool and natural debris, has affected the growth of the bacteria and algae, making the pool appear orange and brown around the edges.

Others
Other locations named Emerald Pool are in Morne Trois Pitons National Park in Dominica, and in Zion National Park in Utah.

See also
List of lakes in California

Notes

Lakes of Mariposa County, California
Lakes of Yosemite National Park
Geothermal features of Yellowstone National Park